François Désiré Jean Drure, OCD (30 January 1859 – 27 May 1917) was a French prelate of the Catholic Church who worked in Iraq as a bishop and apostolic delegate.

Biography
François Désiré Jean Drure was born on 30 January 1859 in Digoin, France. He studied at the minor seminary in Semur-en-Brionnais and the major seminary in Autun. He was ordained a priest on 24 March 1883. In July 1884 he earned a degree in mathematics from the Faculté Catholique de Lyon and in October became a professor at the minor seminary in Rimont. He then, with the endorsement of the bishop of Autun, joined the Carmelites at Montélimar where he took the name Father John of the Holy Family. He took his final vows as a member of the Discalced Carmelites on 8 September 1892.

On 7 November 1902, Pope Leo XIII appointed him Archbishop of Baghdad. He received his episcopal consecration from Cardinal Girolamo Maria Gotti, another Carmelite, on 16 November 1902.

On 5 March 1904, Pope Pius X named him Apostolic Delegate to Mesopotamia, Kurdistan, and Lesser Armenia. He was visiting France when World War One began and hostilities in the Ottoman Empire prevented him from returning to Mosul.

Drure died unexpectedly in his sleep at the chateau of Fragne near Montluçon, France, where the Carmelites of Meaux had taken refuge, on 27 May 1917 at the age of 58.

Notes

References

1859 births
1917 deaths
People from Saône-et-Loire
Discalced Carmelite bishops
Apostolic Nuncios to Iraq
Roman Catholic bishops in the Middle East